"I, Carumbus" is the second episode of the thirty-second season of the American animated television series The Simpsons, and the 686th episode overall. It aired in the United States on Fox on October 4, 2020. The episode was directed by Rob Oliver, and written by Cesar Mazariegos. Mike Duncan was the Roman history consultant.

Michael Palin and Joe Mantegna appear in the episode as the museum curator and Gordus Antonius, respectively. The episode is a parody reimagining to I, Claudius, features the Simpson family learning about ancient Rome. It received generally positive reviews from critics, and watched live in the United States by 1.51 million viewers.

Plot 

While the Simpson family visits a museum exhibit on Ancient Rome, Marge chastises a bored Homer for his lack of ambition when he admits to shirking chances for promotion. The curator overhears their argument and begins to relay the tale of Obeseus the Wide (played by Homer), the son of a poor farmer.

While years of toil make Obeseus strong, his father Abus (played by Grampa Simpson) sells him to the Roman slave master Gordus Antonius (played by Fat Tony) who puts Obeseus in the gladiatorial fighting pits. Obeseus' actions catch the eye of his master's daughter Marjora (played by Marge), who seduces him and gets pregnant. When her father demands the slave who impregnated his daughter reveal himself, Obeseus comes forward and is freed from slavery so he can marry her. Marjora gives birth to their twin children, Bartigula and Lisandra (played by Bart and Lisa), and Gordus gives Obeseus control of his laundry business and his former slave friends as a wedding present.

Years later, Obeseus runs the laundry business into the ground through his incompetence. When the ambitious Marjora tells him to get his act together, Obeseus' slave friends suggest gathering ammonia (used in the cleaning process) by placing pots near drinking establishments. Obeseus becomes wealthy, only for Marjora to push her husband into joining the Senate to raise their status further. Obeseus asks Emperor Quimbus (played by Mayor Quimby) to put him in the Senate, but he refuses. However, his "politically adopted" son Senator Montimus (played by Mr. Burns) offers Obeseus a position in the Senate if he assassinates Quimbus. He reluctantly does so, and Montimus crowns himself emperor and appoints Obeseus to the Senate.

Obeseus becomes rich and powerful (and fat), but Marjora wants more power and goads her son, Bartigula, into assassinating Emperor Montimus as well so he can claim the throne. After he is crowned emperor, Bartigula declares war on Neptune, builds a massive wall across Rome, and kills the entire Senate by dousing themselves with acid. As Bartigula goes mad with power and declares himself a god, Obeseus challenges his son to a gladiatorial battle. The ensuing fight results in their deaths, driving Marjora to commit suicide.

Back in the present, the Simpson family argues about the moral of the tale, and the curator laments letting stupid people into museums.

During the credits, the Roman gods watch the argument, which they have been viewing for years. Minerva complains that the argument has declined in quality, but Jupiter states that he wants to watch it to the end because he has already invested so much time in it, and "it feels like they're wrapping it up".

Production

Development 
The release date of "I, Carumbus" was announced on August 6, 2020. The title of the episode, as well as its writing and directorial credits, were revealed on August 22, 2020.

Casting 
On July 25, 2020, it was announced during the series' panel at Comic-Con @ Home that Michael Palin would be guest-starring during the season. It was later revealed that his appearance would take place in this episode, and that he would be portraying the Museum Curator. Though not officially announced, other than on the promotional posters, Joe Mantegna also appears in the episode as Gordus Antonius (Fat Tony).

Writing 
Michael Palin spoke positively of his experience working on the episode, saying that it was "lovely" to be asked and that he looked forward to seeing how his character looked after his recording. "To be asked to do a sort of guest appearance on The Simpsons is pretty much like going to Buckingham Palace, except not quite as funny!" Palin was quoted to say, referencing himself being knighted the previous year. "It's all done very quickly, efficiently and you are shoehorned into the show."

Marketing 
Promotional posters for the episode were released on September 30, 2020. Also on 2020, Fox released eight promotional pictures from the episode.

Reception

Viewing figures 
In the United States, the episode was watched live by 1.51 million viewers.

Critical response 
Tony Sokol with Den of Geek said, "It is one of the many episodes which will get funnier on repeated viewings. It won't produce more laughs, but the references will seem more clever. There is a little too much respect and consideration for history's follies than the majority of episodes like this" and he gave the episode 3 and half out of 5 stars.

References

2020 American television episodes
The Simpsons (season 32) episodes
Television episodes set in ancient Rome